County Route 536 (CR 536) is a county highway in the U.S. state of New Jersey. The highway extends  from the Commodore Barry Bridge crossing the Delaware River at Chester at the Pennsylvania state line and Logan Township, to U.S. Route 206 (US 206) in Hammonton. Much of the western portion of the route is concurrent with US 322 though it is unsigned along this portion.

Route description

The western  of CR 536 is mostly unsigned and concurrent with other routes, running from the Commodore Barry Bridge over the Delaware River in Logan Township east to Monroe Township in Gloucester County. The county route starts along US 322 as a freeway that interchanges with US 130 before turning into a two-lane undivided road that comes to I-295. In Woolwich Township, the road intersects CR 551 and the New Jersey Turnpike. US 322/CR 536 continue east to the community of Mullica Hill in Harrison Township, where it intersects Route 45. Here, CR 536 heads south with Route 45 and US 322 Bus. while US 322 bypasses Mullica Hill to the northeast along CR 536A. CR 536 and US 322 Bus. split from Route 45 and head east, intersecting US 322/CR 536A again. CR 536 becomes concurrent with US 322 again and continues east. Farther east in Harrison Township is an interchange with the Route 55 freeway. In Glassboro, the road intersects CR 553 and runs concurrent with Route 47. The road continues into Monroe Township where it crosses CR 555.

CR 536 splits from US 322 in the Monroe Township community of Williamstown at an intersection with CR 610 and CR 654. The route heads southeast on two-lane undivided Main Street into residential and commercial areas. The route turns northeast onto Poplar Avenue and crosses US 322 (Black Horse Pike). Past this intersection, CR 536 becomes New Brooklyn Road and passes through inhabited areas. Upon intersecting CR 659, the route turns north onto Malaga Road and enters wooded areas, crossing the Four Mile River into Winslow Township, Camden County and passing over the Atlantic City Expressway. At an intersection with CR 705, CR 536 turns east onto Cedarbrook Road and crosses the Great Egg Harbor River near New Brooklyn Lake. After the CR 720 junction, the route runs through a mix of homes and farm fields. After an intersection with CR 561C, CR 536 becomes Cedar Brook Road and crosses Conrail Shared Assets Operations' Beesleys Point Secondary railroad line before turning northeast and coming to the Route 73/CR 561 junction.

A short distance later, the route turns east onto Pump Branch Road and continues through farmland and residential subdivisions, intersecting CR 718. CR 536 intersects US 30 and forms a brief concurrency with that route on four-lane undivided White Horse Pike before heading northeast onto two-lane Pennington Avenue. The road runs through residential areas and crosses NJ Transit's Atlantic City Line. The route continues into Waterford Township and crosses CR 718, at which point CR 536 becomes Chew Road and heads east-southeast into agricultural areas with some homes before entering the densely forested Pine Barrens. Farther east, the road crosses an abandoned railroad line. The route passes an agricultural clearing before crossing back into the forests and coming into Hammonton in Atlantic County, where CR 536 ends at US 206.

Major intersections

CR 536 Spur 

County Route 536 Spur, abbreviated CR 536 Spur, is a special county highway in New Jersey. It is known locally in Sicklerville, Winslow Township as Williamstown Road, and in Williamstown as Sicklerville Road. A second smaller segment runs along Hopewell Road on the border of Waterford Township and Berlin Township from Jackson Road (CR 534) to the Burlington County line where the road continues into Evesham Township as Hopewell Road.

Major intersections

See also

References

External links 

New Jersey 5xx Routes (Dan Moraseski)

536
536
536
536